The 51st edition of the World Allround Speed Skating Championships for Women took place on 10 and 11 February 1990 in Calgary at the Olympic Oval ice rink.

Title holder was Constanze Moser-Scandolo from East Germany.

This was the first time that the world championships for women had been held in an indoor stadium.

Distance medalists

Classification

 DQ = Disqualified
 * Fell

Source:

References

Attribution
In Dutch

1990s in speed skating
1990s in women's speed skating
1990 World Allround
1990 in women's speed skating